Abegweit Passage is the narrowest part of the Northumberland Strait, comprising the 13-kilometre-wide portion between Cape Traverse, Prince Edward Island, and Cape Tormentine, New Brunswick. This portion of the strait is now spanned by the Confederation Bridge.

The word Abegweit is derived from the Mi'kmaq word Abahquit, meaning "lying parallel with the land", or Epegweit, "lying in the water". It is often loosely translated as meaning "cradled on the waves."

References 

Bodies of water of Prince Edward Island
Bodies of water of New Brunswick
Landforms of Prince County, Prince Edward Island
Landforms of Westmorland County, New Brunswick
Straits of Canada